Coil is an autobiographical Flash game developed by Edmund McMillen and Florian Himsl, released in 2008. It was nominated for the Innovation Award at the 2009 Independent Games Festival and is considered an example of an artgame. The game was sponsored by Armor Games.

References

2008 video games
Art games
Browser games
Flash games
Puzzle video games
Video games developed in the United States
Single-player video games